Ritchie Valens Memorial Album is the first greatest hits compilation by Ritchie Valens, featuring his first three charted hits plus tracks from the previous three albums, released three years following his death in a plane crash. The original album was issued with a black album cover and the same photo of Valens from his second album Ritchie.  A few months later, the album was retitled Ritchie Valens, His Greatest Hits and repackaged with a white album cover and a photo of Ritchie taken from his Del-Fi EP Ritchie Valens Sings (DFEP-1111).  Both issues include the same back cover and album contents.

Track listings
All tracks composed by Ritchie Valens; except where indicated

Side 1
"Donna" 
"We Belong Together" (Hy Weiss, Johnny Mitchell, Robert Carr)
"From Beyond"
"Stay Beside Me" (Bill Olofson, Maurice Ellenhorn)
"Bluebirds Over the Mountain" (Ersel Hickey)
"In a Turkish Town"

Side 2
"Malaguena" (Ernesto Lecuona)
"La Bamba" 
"Come On, Let's Go" 
"Rockin' All Night"
"Cry, Cry, Cry" (Robert Kuhn)
"Hurry Up" (Shari Sheeley)

References

External links

Ritchie Valens compilation albums
1963 greatest hits albums
Del-Fi Records compilation albums
Spanish-language compilation albums